"What We Have Known" is a single by Joanna Newsom. The song appeared on 2003's Yarn and Glue EP and as the b-side to her 2004 single, Sprout and the Bean before being released on its own limited edition 12" vinyl in 2011.

Track listing
 "What We Have Known" – 6:06

References

External links
Drag City, single entry in label catalog

2011 singles
2003 songs
Drag City (record label) singles